William "Squires" Gannon (28 April 1901 – 6 March 1967) was an Irish Gaelic footballer who played as a midfielder for the Kildare senior team. 

Regarded as one of Kildare's greatest-ever players, Gannon was a regular member of the starting fifteen during the team's golden age of the 1920s. During that time he won two All-Ireland medals and four Leinster medals. An All-Ireland runner-up on two occasions, Gannon captained the team to the All-Ireland title in 1928.

At club level, Gannon was a three-time county club championship medalist with the Round Towers team.

References

 

1901 births
1967 deaths
Round Towers (Kildare) Gaelic footballers
Kildare inter-county Gaelic footballers
Winners of two All-Ireland medals (Gaelic football)
All-Ireland-winning captains (football)